The Challenger mine is a gold mine in the Far North of South Australia, 165 km west of the Stuart Highway and 740 km north-west of Adelaide. It was operated by Dominion,  Kingsgate and then WPG Resources. The mine is now on Care and Maintenance. The deposit was named by the geologist who discovered it (David Edgecombe), after his dog.

History
The ore body was discovered in early 1995 by Dominion Mining Ltd. It was found by using the relatively new (at that time) method of sampling calcrete (calcium carbonate laterite). Broad sample spacing of 800m fortuitously "snagged" the sub-surface orebody with a single high gold in calcrete value attracting almost immediate follow-up. The top of the orebody was beneath less than metre of transported cover and calcrete. Exploration drilling commenced in mid-1995 and continued for several years on a campaign basis. The initial drilling programs intersected high grade ore but were unable to consistently hit the ore zones at depth. Further drilling and detailed structural interpretation of the drill core lead to the orebody being defined as several tightly folded linear shoots, plunging at about a 45 degree angle. As yet, the bottom of the ore body has not been discovered, although there are several faults offsetting the orebody. The project was Joint-ventured with Samantha-Resolute in late 1995. Activities stopped during the late 1990s while Dominion negotiated to buy back Resolute's share of the project and then find another Joint-venture partner. Dominion was unable to find a Joint-venture partner and so in 2001 the company decided to develop the mine itself.  The mine was initially an open pit, commencing in 2002 and converted to underground mining in 2005.

Geology and mineralisation
The Challenger deposit is located within portions of Christie gneiss, a member of the Mulgathing Complex that forms part of the Gawler Craton, a large crystalline basement province consisting of late Archaean to Mesoproterozic rocks that became stabilised by around 1,450 Ma.  The deposit occurs within quartz-feldspar-biotite ± garnet-cordierite gneiss, a variation of Christie gneiss. The host to gold mineralisation is a silica and feldspar rich greisenised pegmatite.  These veins are typically ptygmatically folded.  The deposit is typically shear hosted with the morphology of the mineralised envelope being lensoid in three dimensions and anastomosing in character.
Coarse visible gold of variable size and in association with sulphide mineralisation is a common feature of the higher grade ore zones.  Gold grains contain inclusions of arsenopyrite, pyritised pyrrhotite and native bismuth.
All lodes remain open at depth and historical drilling of the M1 lode has demonstrated the continuity of the orebody to at least 2.8 km down-plunge.  Both primary host rock and the quartz, feldspar, garnet veins associated with gold mineralisation are generally competent, necessitating minimal ground support.  Underground conditions are effectively dry with little groundwater inflow into the mine.

The mine had an estimated reserve of 512,000 ounces of gold from a resource of 1 million ounces of gold at June 2007. Mineral resource estimate on 30 June 2017 was 1,621,000 Tonnes of ore  at a grade of 6.99 g/t for 364,000 oz gold.

Byrnecut Mining Australia is the underground mining contractor.

Nature of facility
Challenger Gold Mine is an underground gold mine and processing facility. A diesel power station (PS1), supplies power to the treatment plant, and village. A secondary diesel power station (PS2) supplies power to the underground mine and surface ventilation fan.

The site is either accessed by a nine-hour drive along sealed and unsealed roads or by Air which takes approximately 1.5 hours by plane from Adelaide. The project has changed hands several times, with Kingsgate taking over the project from Dominion in 2010, followed by WPG Resources in 2015. WPG appointed voluntary administrators, then receivers and managers in July and August 2018. The Challenger Mine has stopped operations and gone into Care and Maintenance.

Production
Production figures of the recent past were:

References

External links

 Archived Dominion website

2002 establishments in Australia
Gold mines in South Australia
Far North (South Australia)
Mining in South Australia
Open-pit mines
Surface mines in Australia
Underground mines in Australia